Babylon is a 1980 British drama film directed by Franco Rosso. Written by Franco Rosso and Martin Stellman (Quadrophenia), and shot by two-time Academy Award winner Chris Menges (The Killing Fields), Babylon is an incendiary portrait of racial tension and police brutality set in Brixton, London. The film, anchored by Dennis Bovell’s propulsive score, is partly based on Bovell’s false imprisonment for running a Jamaican sound system, Sufferer’s Hi Fi, in the mid-70s.

Produced by Gavrik Losey and the National Film Finance Corporation, the film is regarded as a classic.

Plot
Babylon follows a young reggae DJ (Brinsley Forde, M.B.E., frontman of the British group Aswad) of the Ital 1 Lion sound system in Thatcher-era South London as he pursues his musical ambitions while also battling fiercely against the racism and xenophobia of employers, neighbours, police, and the National Front.

Cast

Production
Babylon was filmed on the streets of Deptford and Brixton, London. The story centers on sound system culture and themes of police brutality, racism, poverty, and disillusionment with lack of opportunities.

Babylon was filmed on a six-week shooting schedule, entirely on location in South London and the West End. The production headquarters were above a rambling church in Deptford. The set was totally closed to visitors, including journalists, because of the film's sensitive subject matter and the fact that shooting was taking place in an area of London where there was racial tension.

The cast of actors were carefully chosen, with the help of casting director Sheila Trezise, Franco Rosso, and Martin Stellman, who all already had many contacts within the black community. Aside from the regular actors, there were many extras. The vast majority were West Indians living around the Deptford, Lewisham, Peckham, and Croydon areas.

Music
The film features an entirely reggae and dub soundtrack, including artists such as Yabby U, I-Roy, Aswad, and Dennis Bovell.

Release
Babylon world-premiered at Cannes' Semaine de la critique in 1980.

It received an X rating, and was released in the United Kingdom in late 1980, and appeared at the 1981 Toronto International Film Festival on 11 September 1981. Originally deemed “too controversial, and likely to incite racial tension” to play at the New York Film Festival, the film was not released in the United States until 8 March 2019. The U.S. release was distributed by Kino Lorber and Seventy-Seven.

On 20 August 2019, Babylon was released on Blu-ray and DVD by Kino Lorber.

Reception

Critical response 
Babylon received praise from critics both at its original 1980 release and 2019 U.S. release. Many praised its representation of Black youth life in South London during the Thatcher-era. Wesley Morris of The New York Times chose the film as a critic's pick, claiming the film "still feels new… You’re looking at people who, in 1980 England, were, at last, being properly, seriously seen.” Hua Hsu of The New Yorker noted how "few films portray this moment in black British life quite like Franco Rosso’s Babylon".

The film also received acclaim for its themes of racial violence and police brutality. Robert Abele of the Los Angeles Times  called the film "assertive and ebullient... alive as a movie can be". Jaya Saxena of GQ describes Blue's journey as "a story with literally epic stakes".

The film has an approval rating of 100% based on 27 critic reviews on the review aggregator Rotten Tomatoes.

Accolades 
For Babylon, Franco Rosso won the 1981 Evening Standard British Film Awards Most Promising Filmmaker award.

See also 
 Sound system (Jamaican)
 Sound clash
 Toasting (Jamaican music)
 Rockers (1978 film)
 Lovers Rock (2020 film)
 List of hood films

References

External links
 2019 U.S. Release Official Trailer
 
 Fan site
 Assessment of critical reputation

British drama films
1980 films
Hood films
Social realism in film
Black British cinema
Black British films
1980s British films